Antonín Dvořák composed his String Quartet No. 11 in C major, Op. 61, B. 121, between late October and early November 1881 to fulfill a commission from the Hellmesberger Quartet.

Background

In October, 1881 Dvořák finished the sketches for his new opera Dimitrij, when he learned in the Vienna newspapers, that the Hellmesberger Quartet is proposing the performance of his new string quartet in December 1881. He was thus forced to interrupt the work on the opera, and began to compose a quartet.

Dvořák began to compose in F major (on 7 October 1881), but he probably wasn't satisfied with that version, since later (on 25 October 1881) after completing the first movement, he decided to create an entirely new work, in C major.

The composition was supposed to premiere on 15 December 1881 in Ringtheater, but because of the catastrophic conflagration in the building of Ringtheater the performance was postponed. It is not known today when the first performance occurred. The Czech première took place on 5 January 1884; the quartet was played by Ferdinand Lachner, Julius Raušer, Josef Krehan and Alois Neruda.

Structure 
The composition consists of four movements, and lasts around 30 minutes in performance. Two themes based on a polonaise for cello and piano, B. 94, written two years earlier, reappear in the spirited scherzo of the third movement:

References

Footnotes

Bibliography

Antonín Dvořák: Quartetto Ut maggiore, Op. 61.. (Pocket score). Prague: SNKLHU, 1955

External links
Info on a comprehensive Dvořák site
List of Dvořák Chamber works with Burghauser Numbers
Notes to a Juilliard Quartet concert of the C major

Dvorak 11
1881 compositions
Compositions in C major